Camp Opelika was a World War II era prisoner of war (POW) camp in Opelika, Alabama.  Its construction began in September 1942 and it shut down in September 1945. The first prisoners, captured by the British, were part of General Erwin Rommel's feared Africa Corps. It held approximately 3,000 German prisoners at any one time.

Present
The Museum of East Alabama in Opelika hosts a collection of material from Camp Opelika. No trace of the camp remains in the present day; an industrial park now occupies the site just south of I-85 on the south side of Opelika.

A historical marker erected by the Opelika Historic Preservation Society and the Historic Chattachoochee Commission stands at the southwest quadrant of the intersection of Marvyn Parkway and Williamson Avenue. This marker reads:

"Located on this 800 acre site was an enemy prisoner of war camp. Construction of Camp Opelika began in September 1942. The first prisoners, captured by the British, were part of General Erwin Rommel's Africa Corps. The camp prisoner population was maintained around 3000 until the end of World War II, in May 1945. In September 1945 the camp was deactivated and deeded to the City of Opelika. For a brief period the camp quarters were used for veteran's housing before the site became an industrial park."

See also
Georg Gärtner
List of World War II prisoner-of-war camps in the United States

References

Further reading
 – A history of Camp Aliceville which "highlights the human dimension of war and captivity, and shows the various ways in which the small community of Aliceville became connected to events and places in the United States and abroad." Camp Aliceville in western Alabama was similar to Camp Opelika in many regards.

 – A social history of German POWs and their experiences in America.  Contains extensive interviews with prisoners held at Camp Aliceville and other POW camps about their experiences there.

World War II prisoner of war camps in the United States
Defunct prisons in Alabama
Buildings and structures in Lee County, Alabama
1942 establishments in Alabama
1945 disestablishments in Alabama